The 44th South American Swimming Championships were held from 7 to 11 November at the Pool Mansiche in Trujillo, Peru.

Participating countries

Results

Men's events

Women's events

Mixed events

Medal standings

References

External links 
 Official website 
 Results
 Results book 

South American Swimming Championships
South American Swimming Championships
2018 in Peruvian sport
Swimming competitions in Peru
Sports in Trujillo, Peru
November 2018 sports events in South America